Cookia is a genus of large sea snails, marine gastropod molluscs in the family Turbinidae, the turban snails.

Cookia is sometimes treated as a subgenus of the genus Bolma. 

The genus was named after Captain James Cook.

Species
Species within the genus Cookia include:
 †Cookia kawauensis Powell, 1938
 Cookia sulcata (Lightfoot, 1786)

Species brought into synonymy
 Cookia novaezelandiae Lesson, 1832: synonym of Cookia sulcata (Lightfoot, 1786)

References

 Alf A. & Kreipl K. (2011) The family Turbinidae. Subfamilies Turbininae Rafinesque, 1815 and Prisogasterinae Hickman & McLean, 1990. In: G.T. Poppe & K. Groh (eds), A Conchological Iconography. Hackenheim: Conchbooks. pp. 1–82, pls 104-245

Further reading 
 Powell A W B, New Zealand Mollusca, William Collins Publishers Ltd, Auckland, New Zealand 1979 
 Glen Pownall, New Zealand Shells and Shellfish, Seven Seas Publishing Pty Ltd, Wellington, New Zealand 1979 

 
Turbinidae
Taxa named by René Lesson